Och vinnaren är... (Swedish for And the Winner Is...) is the second studio album released by Swedish singer and songwriter Veronica Maggio. It was released in Sweden on 26 March 2008 through Universal Music AB and debuted at number 12 on the Swedish Albums Chart, peaking at number 7.

Singles
 "Måndagsbarn" was released on 11 February 2008 as the lead single from the album. It peaked at number 23 on the Swedish Singles Chart.
 "Stopp" was released on 6 May 2008 as the second single from the album. It peaked at number 30 on the Swedish Singles Chart.
 "17 år" was released in 2009 as the third single from the album. It peaked at number 19 on the Swedish Singles Chart.

Track listing

Charts

Weekly charts

Year-end charts

Release history

References

2008 albums
Universal Music AB albums
Veronica Maggio albums